George Treweeke Scobell (16 December 1785 – 11 May 1869) was the son of Dr Peter Edward Scobell, MD and Hannah née Sandford.

He joined the Navy in 1798 as midshipman aboard , under Captain Francis Pender; and served until accepting the rank of Retired Captain in 1843.

He was Member of Parliament for Bath 1851 to 1857.

See also

References

1785 births
1869 deaths
Members of the Parliament of the United Kingdom for English constituencies
UK MPs 1847–1852
UK MPs 1852–1857
Royal Navy officers